In grammar, the comitative case (abbreviated ) is a grammatical case that denotes accompaniment. In English, the preposition "with", in the sense of "in company with" or "together with", plays a substantially similar role (other uses of "with", like in the meaning of "using" or "by means of" (I cut bread with a knife), correspond to the instrumental case or related cases).

Core meaning
The comitative case encodes a relationship of "accompaniment" between two participants in an event, called the "accompanier" and the "companion". In addition, there is a "relator" (which can be of multiple lexical categories, but is most commonly an affix or adposition). Use of the comitative case gives prominence to the accompanier. This Italian sentence is an example:

[il professore]accompanier entra nell'aula [con]relator [i suoi studenti]companion
'the professor enters the lecture-hall (together) with his students'.

In this case, il professore is the accompanier, i suoi studenti is the companion, and con is the relator. As the accompanier, il professore is the most prominent.

Animacy also plays a major role in most languages with a comitative case. One group of languages requires both the accompanier  and the companion to be either human or animate. Another group requires both to be in the same category: both human or both animate. A third group requires an animate accompanier and an inanimate companion. Other languages have no restrictions based on animacy.

Comparison to similar cases

The comitative case is often conflated or confused with other similar cases, especially the instrumental case and the associative case.

The comitative relates to an accompanier and a companion, and the instrumental relates to an agent, an object, and a patient. Enrique Palancar defines the role of Instrumental case as 'the role played by the object the Agent manipulates to achieve a change of state of the Patient.' Even though the difference is straightforward, because the instrumental and the comitative are expressed the same way in many languages, including English, it is often difficult to separate them.

Russian is one of many languages that differentiate morphologically between instrumental and comitative:

In Russian, the comitative is marked by adding a preposition s and by declining the companion in the instrumental case; the design с мамой as a whole becomes comitative. In the instrumental case, the object is declined, but no preposition is added.

The comitative case is often confused with the associative case. Before the term comitative was applied to the accompanier-companion relationship, the relationship was often called associative case, a term still used by some linguists.

It is important to distinguish between the comitative and the associative because the associative also refers to a specific variety of the comitative case that is used in Hungarian.

Expressions of comitative semantic relation

Grammatical case is a category of inflectional morphology. The comitative case is an expression of the comitative semantic relation through inflectional affixation, by prefixes, suffixes and circumfixes. Although all three major types of affixes are used in at least a few languages, suffixes are the most common expression. Languages which use affixation to express the comitative include Hungarian, which uses suffixes; Totonac, which uses prefixes; and Chukchi, which uses circumfixes.

Comitative relations are also commonly expressed by using adpositions: prepositions, postpositions and circumpositions. Examples of languages that use adpositional constructions to express comitative relations are French, which uses prepositions; Wayãpi, which uses postpositions; and Bambara, which uses circumpositions.

Adverbial constructions can also mark comitative relations, but they act very similarly to adpositions. One language that uses adverbs to mark the comitative case is Latvian.

The final way in which comitative relations can be expressed is by serial-verb constructions. In these languages, the comitative marker is usually a verb whose basic meaning is "to follow". A language which marks comitative relations with serial-verb constructions is Chinese.

Examples

Indo-European languages

French
French uses prepositions to express the comitative semantic relation.

In this case, the preposition "avec" is used to express the comitative semantic relation. The preposition "avec" is the standard comitative marker in French; however, French has a special case, the ornative case, a variety of comitative for bodily property or clothes. The French ornative marker is "à", as for example in the title of the novel and play La Dame aux Camélias, “The lady with, or who wears, camelias.”

Latvian
In Latvian, both instrumental and comitative are expressed with the preposition ar However, it is used only when the companion is in accusative and singular or when it is in dative and plural. Otherwise the co-ordinating conjunction un is used.

In the example above, ar is used because Rudolf, the companion, is in accusative and singular. Below, it is used in the other case that it is allowed, with a dative plural companion.

Uralic languages

Estonian

In Estonian, the comitative (kaasaütlev) marker is the suffix “-ga”.

Finnish
In Finnish, the comitative case (komitatiivi) consists of the suffix -ne with adjectives and -ne- + a mandatory possessive suffix with the main noun. There is no singular-plural distinction; only the plural of the comitative exists and is used in both singular and plural senses, and thus it always appears as -ine-.  For instance, "with their big ships" is

It is rarely used and is mainly a feature of formal literary language, appearing very rarely in everyday speech.

The much more common, less formal way of expressing "with" is with the postposition kanssa, e.g., suurten laivojensa kanssa "with their big ships". The two forms may contrast, however, since the comitative always comes with the possessive suffix and thus can only be used when the agent has some sort of possession of the thing expressed by the main noun. For instance, "The foreign minister, with [assistance from] his colleagues, is continuing the negotiations with the guerrillas", has kollegoineen "with his colleagues" contrasted with  "with the guerrillas", the former "possessed", the latter not.

Colloquial Finnish also has the postposition kaa, derived from kanssa and cognate with the Estonian -ga. With pronouns it is written as a suffix, -kaa.

Sami languages
As there are many Sami languages there are variations between them. In the largest Sami language, Northern Sami, the comitative case means either communion, fellowship, connection - or instrument, tool. It can be used either as an object or as an adverbial.

It is expressed through the suffix -in in the singular and -iguin in the plural.

An example of the object use in Northern Sami is "Dat láve álo riidalit isidiin", meaning "She always argues with her husband". An example of the adverbial use is "Mun čálán bleahkain", meaning "I write with ink".

Hungarian

In Hungarian, comitative case is marked by the suffix "-stul/-stül", as shown in the example below.

However, the comitative case marker cannot be used if the companion  has a plural marker. So when the comitative marker is added to a noun, it obscures whether that noun is singular or plural.

Chukchi

Chukchi uses a circumfix to express comitative case.

In the example, the circumfix га-ма is attached to the root мэлгар "gun" to express comitative.

Drehu

In Drehu, there are two prepositions which can be used to mark comitative. Which of the prepositions is used is determined by the classes of the accompanier and companion.

Hausa

The comitative marker in Hausa is the preposition "dà". In Hausa, a prepositional phrase marked for comitative can be moved to the front of the sentence for emphasis, as shown in the examples below.

In Hausa it is ungrammatical to do the same with coordinating conjunctions. For example, if the companions were "dog and cat", it would be ungrammatical to move either "dog" or "cat" to the front of the sentence for emphasis, while it is grammatical to do so when there is a comitative marker rather than a conjunction.

Further reading

References

Grammatical cases